Terry and the Pirates is an American adventure series based on Milton Caniff's comic strip that was telecast from June 26 to November 21, 1953. The syndicated series ran for 18 episodes and was produced by Don Sharpe Enterprises. Canada Dry Ginger Ale was the show's original sponsor.

A version of Terry and the Pirates debuted on WABD-TV in New York City on November 25, 1952, broadcast on alternate Tuesdays at 7:30 p.m. Dougfair Productions was the packager, and Official Films was the distributor. Dick Irving was the director, and John and Gwen Bagni were the writers.

Overview
USAAF Colonel Terry Lee (John Baer) heads to the Far East to locate a gold mine he inherited from his grandfather. Once in the Orient, Lee becomes a pilot with Air Cathay, a cargo and passenger airline owned and operated by the cunning Chopstick Joe (Jack Reitzen), who is not always honest. His friend and co-pilot is Charles C. Charles, aka Hotshot Charlie (William Tracy, who had played Terry Lee in the 1940 serial Terry and the Pirates), while the romantic interest is provided by the attractive blonde Burma (Sandra Spence). Lee has several encounters in thirteen episodes with his beautiful and mysterious nemesis, Lai Choi San, aka The Dragon Lady (Gloria Saunders).

In the pilot episode, "Macao Gold", Chopstick Joe was portrayed by Jack Kruschen and Burma was played by Mari Blanchard.

Production
In 1951 Sam Katzman obtained the film rights to the comic strip from Douglas Fairbanks Jr but no film resulted.

Twenty-six episodes were filmed using the RKO-Pathe facilities.

Home media
In 2007, Alpha Home Entertainment released four DVD sets of the episodes. Packaged with four episodes per Volume there are only sixteen of the eighteen. Episode 17 ("Overseer") and 18 ("The Diamond Maker") were not included. The episodes are not compiled in any order. The sets have been available from resellers on the internet.

See also
 Terry and the Pirates (comic strip)
 Terry and the Pirates (radio serial)

References

External links

1953 American television series debuts
1953 American television series endings
Black-and-white American television shows
1950s American drama television series
First-run syndicated television programs in the United States
Television shows based on comic strips
Aviation television series
American adventure television series
English-language television shows
Terry and the Pirates
Television series about pirates
Inheritances in fiction